The 1984 Federation Cup was the 22nd edition of the most important competition between national teams in women's tennis.  The tournament was held at the Esporte Clube Pinheiros in São Paulo, Brazil, from 15–22 July.  Czechoslovakia successfully defended their title, defeating Australia in the final.

Qualifying round
All ties were played at the Pinheiros Sports Club in São Paulo, Brazil, on clay courts.

Winning nations advance to Main Draw, losing nations play in consolation rounds.

South Korea vs. Zimbabwe

Chile vs. Philippines

Colombia vs. Indonesia

Venezuela vs. Portugal

Main draw

1st Round losing teams play in consolation rounds

First round

Czechoslovakia vs. Venezuela

Japan vs. Greece

France vs. Netherlands

Denmark vs. Chile

Yugoslavia vs. South Korea

Israel vs. Peru

Soviet Union vs. Uruguay

Bulgaria vs. Great Britain

United States vs. Mexico

Hungary vs. Switzerland

Spain vs. Austria

Canada vs. Italy

Australia vs. Argentina

Colombia vs. Belgium

Brazil vs. Sweden

China vs. West Germany

Second round

Czechoslovakia vs. Greece

France vs. Denmark

Yugoslavia vs. Israel

Soviet Union vs. Bulgaria

United States vs. Switzerland

Austria vs. Italy

Australia vs. Belgium

Sweden vs. West Germany

Quarterfinals

Czechoslovakia vs. France

Yugoslavia vs. Bulgaria

United States vs. Italy

Australia vs. West Germany

Semifinals

Czechoslovakia vs. Yugoslavia

United States vs. Australia

Final

Czechoslovakia vs. Australia

Consolation rounds

Draw

First round

Indonesia vs. Zimbabwe

Hungary vs. South Korea

Portugal vs. Venezuela

Peru vs. Uruguay

Second round

Indonesia vs. Netherlands

Brazil vs. Colombia

Canada vs. Chile

Great Britain vs. Hungary

Venezuela vs. Argentina

Spain vs. China

Japan vs. Philippines

Mexico vs. Peru

Quarterfinals

Netherlands vs. Brazil

Canada vs. Great Britain

Argentina vs. China

Japan vs. Mexico

Semifinals

Brazil vs. Great Britain

Final

Brazil vs. Japan

References

1984
1984 in tennis
Tennis tournaments in Brazil
International sports competitions in São Paulo
1984 in Brazilian tennis
1984 in women's tennis